The White House Cabinet secretary is a high-ranking position within the Executive Office of the President of the United States. The White House Cabinet Secretary is the head of the Office of Cabinet Affairs within the White House Office and the primary liaison between the president of the United States and the Cabinet departments and agencies. The position is usually held by a White House commissioned officer, traditionally either a deputy assistant to the president or an assistant to the president.

According to the White House website, the Cabinet secretary helps "to coordinate policy and communications strategy" and plays "a critical role in managing the flow of information between the White House and the federal departments and in representing the interests of the Cabinet to the White House."

The White House Cabinet secretary is appointed by and serves at the pleasure of the president; the position does not require Senate confirmation. The White House Cabinet secretary is among the twenty-two highest paid positions in the White House. The current White House Cabinet secretary is Evan Ryan.

List of cabinet secretaries

References

Executive Office of the President of the United States
Cabinet of the United States